Carl G. O. Hansen (16 March 1871 – 10 June 1960) was a Norwegian-American journalist, musician and author.

Career
Hansen was born the son of Sivert Christian Hansen (1839-1872) and Marit Megrund (1842-1927) in Trondheim, Norway.  He immigrated to the United States with his mother and siblings in 1881. His mother, widowed since 1872, took the family to Walnut Grove, Minnesota, where her parents and siblings had previously settled. In 1882 she and her children moved to Minneapolis. Except for a short stint in Chicago, her son Carl would live in the city for the next seventy-eight years.

In his adopted hometown Hansen wrote for and edited the Dano-Norwegian newspaper Minneapolis Daglig Tidende (Minneapolis Daily Times) from 1897 until 1935. In Chicago he was similarly employed at Skandinaven newspaper between 1935 and 1937. He then edited Sons of Norway magazine in Minneapolis and served as the organization's educational director from 1939 until his retirement in 1954. A lifelong musician, Hansen sang with and directed male choruses or church choirs from the age of sixteen until impaired hearing forced him to give up the activity.

The Sons of Norway published a songbook in 1926 that provided a comprehensive collection of Norwegian songs for community singing by its membership. A valuable resource, the book enjoyed large sales before finally, in the 1940s, going out of print. The need had arisen for lyrics in both Norwegian and English. A new edition of the book, meeting this requirement, was published in 1948. The two editors, Carl G. O. Hansen and Frederick Wick, produced several of the translations themselves. Since its initial publication, the bilingual Sons of Norway songbook has gone through numerous printings and been reissued in paperback and digital formats.

In 1956 Hansen published a memoir, My Minneapolis, whose subtitle was "A chronicle of what has been learned and observed about the Norwegians in Minneapolis through one hundred years". Although the book was autobiographical, it covered topics outside of the author's personal experience. He wrote, for instance, of Ole Bull's 1856 visit to Minneapolis and of Bjørnstjerne Bjørnson's 1880-1881 Midwestern lecture tour. Upon his arrival in Minneapolis, Hansen encountered the Norwegian authors Kristofer Janson and Knut Hamsun, who lived for a time in the city, and the Norwegian-American artists Jacob Fjelde and Herbjørn Gausta. These men and many others figured in his historical narrative.

Hansen was decorated as a Knight, First Class of the Order of St. Olav in 1923 and received the St. Olav's Medal in 1939.

"I Love Ev'ry Tune"
From the 1948 Sons of Norway Songbook:

Books
History of Sons of Norway 1944
Sons of Norway Songbook 1948
My Minneapolis 1956

Gallery

References

External links
Carl G. O. Hansen Papers at NAHA.
Norwegian-language article
Carl G. O. Hansen: Norsk biografisk leksikon
Carl G. O. Hansen: translation
Photos
Carl G. O. Hanson at the Library of Congress.
Carl G. O. Hansen at the Hennepin County Library.
Carl G. O. Hanson at the National Library of Norway.
Online book
My Minneapolis at the National Library of Norway.
00. Preface
03. Two Notable Scandinavian Visitors
10. The City's First 17th of May Celebration
15. The Bjørnson Visit
28. Kristofer Janson and Knut Hamsun
45. The Cedar-Riverside Area
49. The Ole Bull Monument
52. Herbjørn Gausta

Lyrics from 1948 songbook
Aa kjøre vatten aa kjøre ved
Deilig er jorden
Den store hvide flok vi se
Eg elskar dei voggande tonar
Hils til dem der hjemme
Kan du glemme gamle Norge
Længsel
Når solen ganger til hvile
Se Norges blomsterdal
Sinklars vise
Sætergjentens Søndag
Tordenskjold
Internet Archive audio 
Carl G. O. Hansen
Norwegian singers 
Norwegian songs 
Online recordings
Norwegian songs at the Library of Congress.
Norwegian songs on Edison Cylinder Records.
Norwegian songs at Gustavus Adolphus College.

1871 births
1960 deaths
American male singers
American magazine editors
American newspaper editors
Norwegian emigrants to the United States
Norwegian-American culture in Chicago
Norwegian-American culture in Minnesota
People from Trondheim
Recipients of the St. Olav's Medal
People from Walnut Grove, Minnesota